Adult schools in the United Kingdom were first formed in 1798, to teach working people to read - and write, if they so wished. Arithmetic was considered an unsuitable subject on their day of rest. In their heyday, Adult Schools had over one hundred thousand members around the country: the groups affiliated to County Unions and, in 1899, the National Adult School Union was founded. Since then, both the name and the purpose have changed significantly.

In 1965 the National Adult School Organisation (NASO), an advocacy group for adult education in the United Kingdom, headquartered in Harrogate was chartered. NASO was a voluntary organisation, with about 80 groups located throughout England. It closed in 2010.

See also

References

Further reading

External links